The Katamatite Football Netball Club, nicknamed the Tigers, is an Australian rules football and netball club based in the small Victorian town of Katamatite.

The club teams currently compete in the Picola & District League.

History 
Katamatite's first documented match dates back to June, 1891, when the local team travelled to Dookie and were soundly beaten.

In 1892 and 1893 they played in the Geyde's Victoria Hotel (Cobram) Trophy competition.

In 1894 and 1895, Katamatite played some friendly matches against other local towns, after their application to join the Goulburn Valley Football Association was rejected.

During the mid 1890s, it appears that the local Katamatite footballers, played with the Muckatah Football Club and played some of their home games on the Katamatite ground too.

In May, 1898, a meeting of about 40 locals was held at Allan's Hotel, Katamatite with the view of re-forming the football club and entering the Tungamah or Yarrawonga Football Association.

In June, 1911 at Lease's Hotel, Katamatite, the Murray Valley Junior Football Association was formed from the following clubs – Barooga, Burramine, Cobram, Katamatite and Muckatah, with the Katamatite "Ramblers" (who wore a maroon jumper) winning the inaugural premiership and were runners up to Muckatah in 1912.

In 1914, Katamatite entered a senior team in the Goulburn Valley Football Association (GVFA) and lost the 1st semi final to the Cobram Football Club.

In 1915, the senior side pulled out of the GVFA, but then entered a junior team in the Katandra Junior Football Association.

At a soldiers recruiting meeting held in Katamatite in July, 1915 and then also shortly afterwards at a friendly football match, a number of local footballers signed their military enlistments cards to come forward and "help their King and country in the hour of need".

After World War I had finished, Katamatite returned to the GVFA in 1920 and 1921, only to be "outed" in 1922 when the GVFA club delegates decided to have a railway line association, which meant that Katamatite and Benbartha club's were left in limbo just prior to the start of the football season.

In 1924, Katamatite were admitted into the Dookie Football Association and were defeated by the Dookie Football Club in the Preliminary Final.

On Saturday, 20 July 1925 Katamatite – 78.19 – 487 defeated Wattville – 1.3 – 9, in what was a record score in country football at the time. The apparent score and result was deemed as a no result and both club's were charged with unseemly conduct due to deliberately contriving a match result to win the minor premiership. Also in 1925 the club's colours were blue and white.

Katamatite and Dookie were denied the right to play off in the 1925 grand final when club delegate's abandoned the season abruptly for what seems like no real apparent reason.

In April 1926 the Dookie Football Association was wound up when three of the six clubs we not prepared to reform, which left only Katamatite and Yabba left, which meant Katamatite went into recess for the season.

In 1927, Katamatite joined the Katamatite Dookie Football Association and made the grand final against Yabba, with Yabba winning 9.8 – 62 to 4.11 – 35 played at Dookie.

At the club's 1930 Annual General Meeting, it was decided to change the club's colours to green and gold.

The club went into recess between 1933 and 1936, after the Katandra Football Association folded in early 1933. The club officially re-formed in 1936, with the hope of returning to a local competition in 1937.

In May, 1937, Katamatite applied to enter the Benalla Mulwala Football League, but their offer was rejected by club delegates, which once again left the club without a competition to play.

Katamatite joined the Benalla Tungamah Football League in 1938 and 1939, then moved across to the Murray Football League (MFL) in 1940. Unfortunately the MFL went into recess after the first round of matches was complete (Rd.7), due to World War II.

Katamatite returned to the MFL after World War II in 1946 and 1947, then moved across to the Murray Valley North East Football League in 1948, then unfortunately went into recess in 1949.

From 1950, the club affiliated with the Picola & District Football League (P&DFL) for the first time. In its very first season in the competition Katamatite went top thanks to an 11.17 (83) to 8.5 (53) grand final defeat of Numurkah Seconds. The Tigers again reached the grand final in 1952, but lost to Picola, a result that was repeated two years later.

In 1956 Katamatite left the P&DFL to compete in the Benalla Tungamah Football League. The club remained in this competition, which dropped the word ‘Benalla’ from its name in 1967, until 1994, winning a single senior grade flag in 1979, with Katamatite: 17.11 – 113 defeating Katandra: 14.15 – 99.

The Tigers’ resumption in the P&DFL in 1995 was not quite as spectacular as their original foray as on this occasion it took them two seasons to procure a premiership. Their victims in the 1996 grand final were Strathmerton, Katamatite winning a dour tussle by 25 points, 7.9 (51) to 3.8 (26). The Bulldogs gained revenge the following year when they downed the Tigers in the grand final by 29 points, 12.12 (84) to 7.13 (55). Matthew Collins was awarded the 'Pearce Medal' as the leagues Fairest & Best player for the year.

Around the turn of the century Katamatite played off for the PDFL's senior grade flag on three occasions, with a victory over Blighty in 2001 being sandwiched in between losses to the same club in 2000 and to Katandra in 2004.

When the PDFL was divided into North West and South East Divisions in 2009 Katamatite, competing in the latter, struggled initially, and even succumbed to a winless wooden spoon in 2011. However, thereafter their fortunes improved somewhat, and in 2014 they reached the grand final only to lose heavily to Tungamah. Further finals appearances followed in 2015 and 2016.

The 2017 season was a season to forget for the Tigers; failing to reach finals and recording just four wins under co-coaches Tyler Sprunt and Matt Dwyer.

The 2018 pre-season has seen Jedd Wright appointed the senior coach for the coming season.

Football competitions timeline
Katamatite FC have played in the following football competitions –

Gedye's Victoria Hotel Trophy
 1892 & 1893
Katamatite Football Club
 1894 to 1897. Club did not play in any official competition, but did play some friendly matches against other local towns.
Yarrawonga & Border Football Association
1898  
Katamatite Football Club
 1899 & 1900. Club did not play in any official competition, but did play some friendly matches against other local towns.
Federal District Football Association
1901 & 1902.
Katamatite Football Club
 1903 to 1905. Club did not play in any official competition, but did play some friendly matches against other local towns.
Goulburn Valley Football Association
1906 to 1909
Katamatite Football Club
 1910 Club in recess, but officially supported the Burramine Boosey Football Club in the GVFA.
Murray Valley Junior Football Association
1911 to 1913 – Katamatite Ramblers
Goulburn Valley Football Association
1914
Katandra Junior Football Association
1915
Katamatite Football Club
 1916 & 1919. Club did not play in any official competition, due to World War I but did play some friendly patriotic fund raising matches against other local towns.
Goulburn Valley Football Association
1920 & 1921
Katamatite Football Club
 1922. Club did not play in any official competition, as it was refused entry into the GVFA as the town was not on a railway line.
Dookie Football Association
1923 to 1925.
Katamatite Football Club
 1926. Club did not play in any official competition, as the Dookie FA was wound up.
Katamatite Dookie Football Association
 1927 to 1928
Katandra Football Association
 1929 to 1932
Katamatite Football Club
 1933 to 1937. Club in recess & did not play in any official competition, after the Katandra FA was wound up in early 1933.
Benalla Tungamah Football League
 1938 & 1939
Murray Football League
 1940
Katamatite Football Club
 1941 to 1945. Club in recess due to World War II.
Murray Football League
1946 & 1947
Murray Valley & North East Football League
1948
Katamatite Football Club
 1949. Club in recess.
Picola & District Football League
1950 to 1955
Benalla Tungamah Football League
1956 to 1966
Tungamah Football League
1967 to 1994
Picola & District Football League
1995 to present day

Football Premierships

Football League Fairest & Best Award Winners

Murray Football League – Fairest & Best Award – O'Dwyer Medal
 1947 – Bill Lumsden

Benalla Tungamah Football League – Fairest & Best Award – Lawless Medal

 1960 – N Trewin
 1967 – T Murphy
 1978 – Bernie Londigan
 1979 – Andy Alderton
 1982 – Andy Alderton
 1986 – Gary Cameron

Picola & District Football League – Fairest & Best Award – Pearce Medal
 1996 – Matthew Collins
 2014 - Tyson Saunders
 2019 - John Woodcock

Katamatite FC players who played in the VFL/AFL
The following footballers played with Katamatite FC, prior to playing senior football in the VFL, with the year indicating their VFL debut.

 1905 – Rod McGregor – Carlton
 1948 – Bill Lumsden – St. Kilda
 1981 – Darren Flanigan – Geelong
 1984 – Michael Howard – Melbourne
 1987 – Gary Cameron – Geelong
 2009 – Sam Wright – North Melbourne
 2013 – Tom Clurey – Port Adelaide

References

External links
 Gameday website
 Trove Newspapers - Katamatite FC History
 Picola & DFL History
 1979 Tungamah FL Premiers: Katamatite FC team photo

Picola & District Football League clubs
Australian rules football clubs in Victoria (Australia)
Netball teams in Victoria (Australia)